Roberto Sacasa Sarria (27 February 1840 – 2 June 1896) was the President of Nicaragua from 5 August 1889 to 1 January 1891 and again from 1 March 1891 to 11 July 1893.

Ancestry
He was the son of Juan Bautista Sacasa Méndez and Casimira Sarria Montealegre, daughter of Ramón de Sarria y Reyes and Francisca Montealegre Romero (sister to Mariano Montealegre y Romero),    themselves the offspring of  Mariano Ignacio Montealegre Balmaceda and Casimira Romero Sáenz. Casimira was the daughter of Cecilio Antonio Romero Parajeles and Bárbara Sáenz Bonilla.   Barbara, in turn, was the  daughter of Manuel Sáenz Vázquez and Ana Antonia Bonilla Astúa, herself the  daughter of Juan Bonilla Pereira and Francisca Astúa Cháves de Alfaro.  Francisca was the daughter of Juan Astúa and Ana Cháves de Alfaro.

His brother Antioco Sacasa Sarria married Ramona Sacasa Cuadra , sister of Angela Sacasa Cuadra his wife. 

He was a maternal relative of Silvestre Selva Sacasa, Supreme Director of Nicaragua appointed by the invading forces of Francisco Malespín during the Malespín's War, and Benjamín Lacayo Sacasa, acting President of Nicaragua during the 1940s.

Political career
Sacasa, a member of the Conservative Party, had many problems due to a split within the conservatives. A rebellion by ex-president Joaquín Zavala in 1893 led to liberal José Santos Zelaya coming to power, ending 35 years of conservative rule.

Marriage and issue
He married his cousin Ángela Sacasa Cuadra and had:

 Juan Bautista Sacasa Sacasa, 18th President of Nicaragua married María Argüello-Manning, a cousin of Leonardo Argüello, 20th President of Nicaragua, and had:
 Maruca Sacasa-Argüello
 Carlos Sacasa-Argüello
 Roberto Sacasa-Argüello, grandfather of US playwright Roberto Aguirre-Sacasa
 Gloria Sacasa-Argüello
 Dolores Sacasa Sacasa, daughter of his brother, Antioco Sacasa Sacasa married to Ramón Sevilla Castellón, and had: 
 Guillermo Sevilla Sacasa (b. León, Nicaragua)  
 Alberto Sevilla-Sacasa (b. León, Nicaragua) 
 Oscar Sevilla-Sacasa(b. León, Nicaragua) 
 Rafael Sevilla-Sacasa(b. León, Nicaragua) 
 Edda Sevilla-Sacasa (b. León, Nicaragua)
 Ligia Sevilla-Sacasa(b. León, Nicaragua) 
 Julia Sevilla-Sacasa(b. Managua, Nicaragua) married to James Kudriavtsev (married 1960-divorced in 1970) and have two children. Later she married Henri Alexandre DeBayle-Sacasa and have four children (married 1971): 
 Clelia Kudryavtseva Sevilla-Sacasa de Pereau (b. Washington D.C., United States) (1965–1998), married to Jean-Louis Pereau (1959-1998) both crash victims on board Swissair Flight 111 and had three children:
 Joelle Pereau  (b. Luxembourg City, Luxembourg)  (1991–1998), crash victim on board Swissair Flight 111.
 Sylvie Pereau (b. Geneva, Switzerland) (1993–1998), crash victim on board Swissair Flight 111.
 Yves Pereau (b. Paris, France) (1995–1998), crash victim on board Swissair Flight 111.
 George Mikhail Wallace Sevilla-Sacasa, (b. Washington D.C., United States) was married to Leyla Argüello Grons (b. Portuguese East Africa) and now (divorced) they have one child.
 Ryan Wallace-Sacasa Argüello-Olivas (b. 1993 in Coral Gables, Dade County, Florida)
 Xavier DeBayle-Sevilla (b. Washington D.C., United States
 Robert DeBayle-Sevilla  (b. Managua, Nicaragua)
 Nicolas DeBayle-Sevilla (b. Managua, Nicaragua)
 Alexandra DeBayle-Sevilla (b. Washington D.C., United States) (Single)

 Casimira Sacasa Sacasa, married to Dr. Luis Henri Debayle Pallais, son of French Luis Henri Debayle Montgolfier and wife Salvadora Pallais y Bermúdez, and had: 
 Blanca Debayle Sacasa, married to Dr. Nestor Portocarrero Gross, and had: 
 Hope Portocarrero Debayle, married to her first cousin Anastasio Somoza Debayle, 73rd and 76th President of Nicaragua, and had issue
 Nestor Portocarrero Debayle (b. Tampa, Hillsborough County, Florida)
 Salvadora Debayle Sacasa, married to Anastasio Somoza García, 65th and 69th President of Nicaragua, and had issue
 Lillian Somoza Debayle married Guillermo Sevilla Sacasa, and had issue
 Guillermo Anastasio Sevilla Somoza
 Lillian Salvadora Sevilla Somoza
 Luis Ramón Sevilla Somoza
 Edda Maria Sevilla Somoza
 Julia Dolores Sevilla Somoza
 Lorena Isabel Sevilla Somoza
 Eduardo José Sevilla Somoza
 Alejandro Xavier Sevilla Somoza
 Bernardo David Sevilla Somoza
 Luis Somoza Debayle, married Isabel Urcuyo, and had issue
  Salvadora Somoza Urcuyo
  Bernabé Somoza Urcuyo
  Luis Somoza Urcuyo
  Álvaro Somoza Urcuyo
  Gerardo Somoza Urcuyo
 Anastasio Somoza Debayle, married to his first cousin Hope Portocarrero Debayle, and had issue
 Anastasio Somoza Portocarrero (b. Miami, Dade County, Florida)
 Julio Somoza Portocarrero
 Carolina Somoza Portocarrero
 Carla Somoza Portocarrero
 Roberto Somoza Portocarrero

References

 

Presidents of Nicaragua
Vice presidents of Nicaragua
1840 births
1896 deaths
Conservative Party (Nicaragua) politicians
19th-century Nicaraguan people